The roughnose grenadier (Trachyrincus murrayi) is a species of fish in the subfamily Macrourinae (rat-tails). The species is named for Sir John Murray.

Description

It has huge, bulbous black eyes and a sharp, pointed snout.

Habitat

Behaviour
The roughnose grenadier spawns in March–May and feeds on crustaceans; it can live for 40 years.

References

Macrouridae
Fish described in 1887
Taxa named by Albert Günther